Kololi is a resort town on the shore of the Atlantic Ocean in Gambia. It is surrounded by the Bijilo Forest.

The primary hotels are located on "The Strip" which is a short road leading to the beach and the hotels of Senegambia and the Kairaba. The Strip is lined with restaurants and entrance is monitored by the Gambian tourist police. A favorite with tourists, particularly from the UK, Belgium, Germany and The Netherlands.

External links 
Hotels, information & photos

Populated coastal places in the Gambia
Greater Banjul Area
Kombo North/Saint Mary